San Hing Tsuen is the name of two villages in Hong Kong:

 San Hing Tsuen (Tuen Mun District) in Lam Tei, Tuen Mun District
 San Hing Tsuen (Yuen Long District) in Lau Fau Shan, Yuen Long District